Periptychidae is a family of Paleocene placental mammals, known definitively only from North America. The family is part of a radiation of early herbivorous and omnivorous mammals formerly classified in the extinct order "Condylarthra", which may be related to some or all living ungulates (hoofed mammals). Periptychids are distinguished from other "condylarths" by their teeth, which have swollen premolars and unusual vertical enamel ridges. The family includes both large and small genera, with the larger forms having robust skeletons. Known skeletons of periptychids suggest generalized terrestrial habits.

References
McKenna, Malcolm C., and Bell, Susan K. 1997. Classification of Mammals Above the Species Level. Columbia University Press, New York, 631 pp. 
Middleton M.D. and E.W. Dewar, 2004. New mammals from the early Paleocene Littleton fauna (Denver Formation, Colorado) Bulletin of the New Mexico Museum of Natural History and Science 26:59-80.
Rose, Kenneth D. 2006. The Beginning of the Age of Mammals. The Johns Hopkins University Press, Baltimore, 428 pp.

Condylarths
Paleocene mammals
Prehistoric mammals of North America
Paleocene first appearances
Paleocene extinctions
Prehistoric mammal families